Zilairsky District (Yılayır rayonı) is an administrative and municipal district (raion), one of the fifty-four in the Republic of Bashkortostan, Russia. It is located in the south of the republic and borders with Burzyansky District in the north, Baymaksky District in the east, Khaybullinsky District in the southeast and south, Zianchurinsky District in the southwest and west, and with Kugarchinsky District in the west and northwest. Its administrative center is the rural locality (a selo) of Zilair. As of the 2010 Census, the total population of the district was 16,590, with the population of Zilair accounting for 33.7% of that number.

History
The district was established in 1930.

Administrative and municipal status

Within the framework of administrative divisions, Zilairsky District is one of the fifty-four in the Republic of Bashkortostan. The district is divided into thirteen selsoviets, comprising fifty-seven rural localities. As a municipal division, the district is incorporated as Zilairsky Municipal District. Its thirteen selsoviets are incorporated as thirteen rural settlements within the municipal district. The selo of Zilair serves as the administrative center of both the administrative and municipal district.

Demographics

Ethnic composition (as of the 2010 Census):
Bashkirs: 56.5%
Tatars: 3.2%
Russians: 36.2%
Chuvash: 2.8%
other ethnicities: 1.3%

References

Notes

Sources

Districts of Bashkortostan
States and territories established in 1930